Tarun Khiwal (born 1965) is an Indian fashion and commercial photographer. An engineer by education, he left his first job in 1989, and apprenticed with photographers, Hardev Singh, Atul Kasbekar and Prabuddha Dasgupta, before starting out on his own in 1995.

A photographer in the fashion industry, he was awarded the 2005 Hasselblad Masters Award, given by the Hasselblad Foundation, he is the first and only Indian recipient so far of the award. His other awards include, "Fashion Photographer of the Year Award" at the Lycra MTV Style Award and Kingfisher Fashion Photographer of the Year. In 2015, he was part of "The Reflected Eye” organized by Totem which was a narrative photo exhibition that happened at New York and pays homage to and celebrates the artist behind the camera alongside pioneers from the Photography fraternity - Rankin, Ralph Gibson, Douglas Kirkland, Alexi Lubomirski, Platon and the likes. He is also listed among the top ten photographer by Model management.

Early life and background
Tarun Khiwal was born in Mathura, Uttar Pradesh, and grew up in Lucknow, where his father was an Indian Railways officer. He started taking photographs at age 15, after his father gave him a Pentax K1000 camera. Growing up, he wanted to become a painter, however neither it nor photography was considered financially viable career option by his father, thus ended up studying mechanical engineering at the Institute of Tool Room Training, Lucknow, where he studied for the next four years.

Career
After completing his education, Tarun started his career in early 1989, designing press and die casting tools at West India Power Equipments Pvt. Ltd in Jagdishpur, an industrial town near Lucknow. However, finding him unable to apply himself well at work, even eight months after joining, the technical director of the company, gave him the book,The Magic of Thinking Big to read. The book impacted him deeply. A few days later, he returned the book and also left the job.

Thus, he shifted base to Delhi in November 1989. A few months later, he gained apprenticeship with renowned architectural and interior photographer, Hardev Singh. This was followed by apprenticeships with fashion photographers, Atul Kasbekar and Prabuddha Dasgupta. With the latter, he apprenticed for two years, this left a deep impact of photography, as he later recounted in an interview, " (with Dasgupta) I discarded all the notions I had about photography." In 1995, he started to work independently, initially with magazines like Society and First City. This gradually led to his entry to the fashion industry, over the next few years.

Recognition came to him in 2004, when he was awarded the "Fashion Photographer of the Year Award" at the Lycra MTV Style Award and Kingfisher Fashion Photographer of the Year award, while international recognition came with the Hasselblad Masters Award in 2005, which made him the first and only Indian photographer to win the award. He incorporated his experiences while growing up into fashion and brought about an Indianess and took Indian fashion to the world. Not only did he shoot western fashion but also a lot of traditional Indian textile and clothing and made images which were upheld Indian aesthetics were yet fashionable and have received appreciation throughout the world. His campaigns for L'affaire and Ekaya blend in Indian Fashion, culture and tradition aesthetically.

Over the years, Khiwal has worked with brands such as Reebok, Nestle, Nokia, Panasonic, Gillette, American Express and Honda and magazines like Elle,Tank Vogue,Harpers Bazaar, Grazia.

Awards

HASSELBLAD MASTER - 2005

MTV STYLE LYCRA AWARD 2004

ASIAN PHOTOGRAPHY AWARD: PHOTOGRAPHER OF THE YEAR 2005

ASIAN PHOTOGRAPHY AWARD: PHOTOGRAPHER OF THE YEAR 2015

EPSON MASTERS WORLDWIDE EPSON PRO PROGRAMME

MARIE CLAIRE FASHION PHOTOGRAPHER OF THE YEAR 2009

L'OFFICIEL LUXURY AWARD, 2008

F AWARD - FASHION PHOTOGRAPHER OF THE YEAR 2005

References

External links
 Interview in Classic Imaging Magazine
 Interview in Oneworldnews
 Interview in French magazine Modelixr

1965 births
Living people
Artists from Lucknow
Indian fashion photographers
Commercial photographers
Photographers from Uttar Pradesh